Bodonchar Munkhag (Mongol: Бодончар Мөнх, ; died 10th Century CE.) was a renowned Mongol warlord and a direct ancestor of Genghis Khan as well as of the Barlas Mongols, the tribe of the Central Asian warlord Timur.

According to the Secret History of the Mongols, he was the 12th generation nominal (non-biological) descendant of Borte Chino. Genghis Khan was the 9th generation biological descendant of Bodonchar Munkhag (sometimes written Butanchar the Simple). Bodonchar Munkhag is the founder of the House of Borjigin. Chagatai tradition dates 'Buzanjar Munqaq' to the rebellion of Abu Muslim or 747 CE. The name Borjigin does not come from Bodonchar but from Bodonchar's nominal great-grandfather Borjigidai the Wise (Borjigidai Mergen). The date 747 CE corresponds better with Borjigidai Mergen. A confusion with Bayanchur Khan could also account for this date discrepancy. Bodonchar Munkhag means "little misbegotten simpleton". Bodonchar or more accurately Butunchar (Mongolian back vowel ʊ) is a diminutive form of "butuchi" (illegitimate child, misbegotten, bastard) using the diminutive suffix "-nchar" while Munkhag means fool or simpleton. The meaning of the name contrasts with his elevated stature among the Mongol tribes.

History
The Mongol tribes of Genghis Khan's time had a very good knowledge of their genealogy, second only to the Arabs, according to Rashid Al-Din Hamadani. In the Secret History of the Mongols (Paragraph 121) Old-man Khorchi Usun of the Baarin tribe leaves Jamukha and joins Genghis Khan. He tells Genghis Khan: "We (the Baarin) were born from the captured wife of Butunchar Bogd (Butunchar the Divine Ancestor). Therefore we are one womb, one blood with Jamukha. We would never leave the side of Jamukha. But Zaarin (a message-bearing spirit) came and showed me a vision." He goes on to say that the vision predicted the future rise of Genghis Khan. Butunchar Munkhag was a commonly-known figure even among distant tribes such as the Baarin, who were descended from the first wife of Butunchar, a captured pregnant woman who described herself as "Jarchuud Adankhan Uriankhajin" ("-jin" is a feminine suffix) meaning "female of the Jarchuud Adankhan clan of the Uriankhai tribe". Although the Secret History of the Mongols includes some mythical elements such as visions and so forth, the individuals and tribes are seen as historical.

Circumstances of birth
At the time Butunchar Munkhag was born (around 900CE) the Mongol tribes were located around Mount Burkhan Khaldun at the source of the Onon River. The Mongols were the Menggu Shiwei (蒙兀室韋) of the larger Shiwei (室韋) confederation, a Mongolic-speaking group closely related to the Khitan people. The paternal (non-biological) great-grandmother of Butunchar was called Mongoljin Gua meaning "beautiful Mongoless" or "fair woman of the Mongol tribe".

The Mongol tribe had lived around Mount Burkhan Khaldun since at least the time of Borte Chino, 12 generations before Bodonchar Munkhag or around 600CE. They shared the area with the ancient Uriankhai tribe, a prominent Shiwei tribe named Wuluohu (烏羅護) in the Chinese histories. There they lived a pastoral life supplemented by hunting the abundant game of the surrounding forested mountains. To the north  the Bargut tribe lived around Lake Baikal and the Khori Tumed tribe, also around Lake Baikal. To the east were the Tatar tribes (Airigud Tatar, Buirigud Tatar etc.) who also belonged to the Shiwei group. Slightly to the west of the Mongols were the ancient Bayid tribe. These pre-Butunchar early tribes, mentioned in the Secret History, had marriage relations with the early Mongols.

Many of the other tribes in the Secret History were later descendants of Butunchar, such as the Jadaran, Baarin, Jegureid, Noyokhon, Barlas, Budagad, Adarkin, Urugud, Mangud, Besud, Oronar, Khonkhotan, Arulad, Sunid, Khabturkhas, Geniges, Taichud and Jurkin. All these core Borjigin tribes were clustered around Mount Burkhan Khaldun and were still known as Mongols. In the Secret History (Paragraph 52) it says, after listing all the tribes born from Butunchar Munkhag: "Khabul Khan was in charge of all Mongols (Khamag Mongol). After Khabul Khan, although Khabul Khan had seven sons, Ambaghai Khan the son of Sengum Bilge took charge of all the Mongols."

The Secret History of Mongols gives the following account of the immediate ancestry of Butunchar Munkhag:

Events of Bodonchar's Life
The Secret History continues with the following account of Bodonchar's life:

The account goes on to say that the captured pregnant woman gave birth to her son who became the ancestor of the Jadaran tribe. She also bore a child from Butunchar who was called Baaridai who became ancestor of the Baarin tribe. Butunchar got another wife who came with a proper dowry. The dowry included a female servant who became Butunchar's third wife. Genghis Khan was descended from Khabu Baatar the son of Butunchar's second wife. Jeguredei was the son of the third wife and was later excluded from the tribal sacrifices.

He was given temple name Shizu during reign of Yuan dynasty in China.

References

9th-century Mongolian people
10th-century Mongol rulers
10th-century Mongolian people
Tengrist monarchs
Mongol khans